Dermomurex scalaroides is a species of sea snail, a marine gastropod mollusk in the family Muricidae, the murex snails or rock snails.

Description
The length of the shell varies between 6 mm and 21 mm.

Distribution
This marine species occurs in the Mediterranean Sea, in the Atlantic Ocean off West Africa and the Canary Islands.

References

 Settepassi F. (1970). Atlante Malacologico. Molluschi marini viventi nel Mediterraneo, volume I. 296 pp. Museo di Zoologia, Roma
 Gofas, S.; Le Renard, J.; Bouchet, P. (2001). Mollusca, in: Costello, M.J. et al. (Ed.) (2001). European register of marine species: a check-list of the marine species in Europe and a bibliography of guides to their identification. Collection Patrimoines Naturels, 50: pp. 180–213
 Merle D., Garrigues B. & Pointier J.-P. (2011) Fossil and Recent Muricidae of the world. Part Muricinae. Hackenheim: Conchbooks. 648 pp. page(s): 214

External links
 

Gastropods described in 1829
Dermomurex